Torrean "Tory" Douglas Epps (May 28, 1967 – June 1, 2005) was an American football defensive tackle in the National Football League for the Atlanta Falcons, the Chicago Bears, and the New Orleans Saints. He also played in the Arena Football League for the Tampa Bay Storm. He played college football at Memphis State University. Epps died of a blood clot in 2005.

References

1967 births
2005 deaths
People from Uniontown, Pennsylvania
American football defensive tackles
Players of American football from Pennsylvania
Memphis Tigers football players
Atlanta Falcons players
Chicago Bears players
New Orleans Saints players
Tampa Bay Storm players